Olof Godlieb de Wet (1739–1811) was a South African high-ranking official in the Dutch East India Company and co-founder of the Freemasons in South Africa.

Personal life

He  was born in middle 1739 in Cape Town, South Africa. De Wet's grandfather Jacobus de Wet emigrated from Amsterdam, The Netherlands in 1693 to South Africa.  His parents were Maria Magdalena Blankenberg and Johannes Carolus de Wet. He married  Magdalena Saria Maria Butger in July 1761, and out of their marriage one child was born. He died at age 72 in Cape Town, South Africa  on 6 December  1811.

Work path

He started his working career in the Dutch East India Company (DEIC) in 1757. Through the years he stayed with the DEIC and started as assistant and followed that up with a bookkeeper (1768), office manager (1772), buyer (1775) and then a member of the Council of Justice  in 1778. This was followed by work as a store manager (1782) and auctions manager(1785). 

In this period he acted as Journal Writer  and assistant for Governor Joachim van Plettenberg, on the governor's trips.  
 
De Wet became the  president of the Council of Commissioners for Civil and Matrimonial Affairs, in 1787. He was the president of the Council of Justice and Receiver of Revenue, in 1791 and 1793 respectively.

In the  beginning  of 1795, de Wet led an official commission that went to Graaff-Reinet to look into complaints by the residents against, Magistrate Honoratius Maynier . This was  done  on instructions received from  Commissioner General   Abraham  Sluijsken.

Freemasons

In 1772 de Wet together with the  German banker Chiron, the Dutch Ships Captain van der Weijden  and locals ( Brand, de Wit, le Febre, van Schoor, Gie, and Pieter Soermans) started the first  Freemasonry movement in South Africa.

References 

1739 births
1811 deaths
People from Cape Town
South African Freemasons